Zdeněk Blatný (born January 14, 1981) is a Czech former professional ice hockey left wing who played in the National Hockey League (NHL) with the Atlanta Thrashers and the Boston Bruins. He was drafted in the third round, 68th overall, by the Thrashers in the 1999 NHL Entry Draft.

Playing career
After four seasons in the Western Hockey League, with the Seattle Thunderbirds and Kootenay Ice, Blatný joined the American Hockey League's Chicago Wolves for the 2001–02 season.  He made his NHL debut with the Thrashers during the 2002–03 season, appearing in four games.  He appeared in 16 more games with the Thrashers in the 2003–04 season, with the rest of his time during those seasons spent in the AHL with the Wolves.

Following the 2004–05 NHL lockout, during which Blatný played in Finland and in his native Czech Republic, he joined the Boston Bruins for the 2005–06 season.  He appeared in five games with the Bruins before being traded in February 2006 to the Tampa Bay Lightning.  He spent the remainder of the campaign with the Lightning's AHL affiliate, the Springfield Falcons.

In the last season under contract with the Lightning in 2006–07, Blatný continued with the Springfield Falcons, contributing with 13 points in 19 games before he opted to end his North American career and concentrate on a European career in signing with Swedish outfit Modo Hockey of the then Elitserien on January 12, 2007.

Blatný played in 7 various European leagues over the following 8 seasons, before ending his professional career during the 2014–15 season, last playing with Dornbirner EC of the Austrian Hockey League (EBEL).

Career statistics

Regular season and playoffs

International

Awards and honours

References

External links

1981 births
Living people
HC Ambrì-Piotta players
Atlanta Thrashers draft picks
Atlanta Thrashers players
HC Benátky nad Jizerou players
HC Bílí Tygři Liberec players
Boston Bruins players
Chicago Wolves players
Czech expatriate ice hockey players in Canada
Czech expatriate ice hockey players in the United States
Czech ice hockey forwards
Dornbirn Bulldogs players
HK Dukla Trenčín players
Frederikshavn White Hawks players
Graz 99ers players
Greenville Grrrowl players
Hannover Indians players
Kootenay Ice players
HC Košice players
Modo Hockey players
Orli Znojmo players
Lahti Pelicans players
Ice hockey people from Brno
Providence Bruins players
Seattle Thunderbirds players
Springfield Falcons players
Vienna Capitals players
Czech expatriate ice hockey players in Finland
Czech expatriate ice hockey players in Sweden
Czech expatriate ice hockey players in Switzerland
Czech expatriate ice hockey players in Germany
Czech expatriate ice hockey players in Slovakia
Czech expatriate sportspeople in Denmark
Czech expatriate sportspeople in Austria
Expatriate ice hockey players in Austria
Expatriate ice hockey players in Denmark